Leon Felderer (born 30 January 2000) is an Italian luger who competes internationally.
 
He represented his country at the 2022 Winter Olympics.

References

External links
 
 
 

2000 births
Living people
Italian male lugers
Olympic lugers of Italy
Lugers at the 2022 Winter Olympics